Larbi Lazhari (born 3 July 1941 in Algiers) represented Algeria in the gymnastic events at the 1968 Summer Olympic Games.

See also
 Algeria at the 1968 Summer Olympics

References

External links
 

Gymnasts at the 1968 Summer Olympics
Olympic gymnasts of Algeria
Algerian male artistic gymnasts
1941 births
Living people
Sportspeople from Algiers
21st-century Algerian people